Forest Song is a 1963 Soviet fantasy film directed by  Viktor Ivchenko.

Plot  
There is a guy and a girl who are reading the book "The Forest Song" by Lesya Ukrainka on the river bank. Reading transfers them to Polesia where the action of the drama takes place.

The mythological characters and people meet in the magic wood. The music of the nozzle which is played by a country guy Lukash awakens the forest girl Mavka from a dream. They fall in love. Mavka leaves the forest kingdom and goes to people because of Lukash. Lukash's mother treats Mavka with hostility. She insists on Lukash’s marriage the widow Kilin and it causes a very intolerable pain to Mavka. But she is taken away "By the one who sits in the rock ". Leshy damns Lukash for his unfaithfulness and turns him into a wolf.

After Lukash’s uncle death he flounces in the wood, and his shout returns Mavka from the drowsiness. She forgives Lukash, and that becomes a man again.

Hoping to meet Lukash Mavka comes to his house where meets Kilina, and that damns her. Mavka turns into a weeping willow. Lukash comes back home, and Kilina's son asks him to play a pipe. Lukash plays the melody which made acquaintance with Mavka. The pipe plays Mavka’s voice, and Kilina makes Lukash to cut down a willow. After Lukash’s refusal Kilina tries to make it herself. Perelesnik saves Mavka.

Lukash goes to the wood where meets Mavka's wraith. The memories of spring and love in an autumn night cover with the snow. Lukash sits still under the birch … The girl reads the final words of the book on the seashore, stroking the guy’s head.

Cast  
 Raisa Nedashkovskaya as Mavka
 Volodymy Sydorchuk as Lukash
 Petro Vesklyarov as Uncle Lev
 Volodymyr Rudin as Spirit of the Forest
 Valery Kvitka as Forest Fire
 Varvara Maslyuchenko (Hubenko) as Lukash's Mother
 Raisa Pyrozhenko as Kylyna
 Raisa Doroshenko as Water Nymph
 Ada Rogovtseva as Meadow Nymph (as A. Rogovtseva)
 Leonid Marchenko as Kutz (as L. Marchenko)

See also 
The Forest Song
Lesya Ukrainka

External links  
 
 

1963 films
Soviet fantasy films
Films directed by Viktor Ivchenko
Films based on works by Lesya Ukrainka